The  singles Tournament at the 2006 Banka Koper Slovenia Open took place between September 18 and September 24 on outdoor hard courts in Portorož, Slovenia.

Tamira Paszek emerged as the winner.

Seeds

Draw

Finals

Top half

Bottom half

References

2006 Singles
Banka Koper Slovenia Open - Singles